In the Ecstasy of Billions can refer to:

 In the Ecstasy of Billions (1920 film), a 1920 German film
 In the Ecstasy of Billions (1922 film), a 1922 German film